Zambia women's national under-17 football team, nicknamed the Junior She-polopolo, represents the country in international under-17 matches. The team has participated in FIFA sanctioned events, including U-17 World Cup qualifiers.

Background
Zambia women's national under-17 football team is nicknamed the Junior She-polopolo. The team's official kit colours include green shorts, a green jersey and green socks. Women's football was formally organised by the Football Association of Zambia in 1983.  Since that time, Zambia has created a women's senior national team and an under-20 team. Women's football continues to be supported by the national federation who have budgeted money for the women's game and youth game. In 2009, there were 100 women's teams for players over 16, and 112 youth women's teams for players under 16.

Women's football in Africa as a whole faces problems that include limited access to education, poverty amongst women in the wider society, and fundamental inequality present in the society that occasionally allows for female specific human rights abuses. When quality football players are produced in Africa, often they leave the country to seek greater opportunities elsewhere, to the detriment of the local game. Funding also is a problem for the women's game in Africa, with most of the funding for women's football in the Africa coming from FIFA, not the local national football association.

Performance
Zambia women's national under-17 football team has competed in several competitions representing their country, including in the qualifying part of the FIFA U-17 World Cup, and the African Women U-17 Championships.

The team participated in the 2008, 2010 and 2012 African qualification tournaments for the FIFA U-17 World Cup. Zambia women's national under-17 football team participated in the 2008 African Women U-17 Championship. In the preliminary round, they played Ghana women's national under-17 football team.  In the 3 February match in Lusaka, they lost 0–2.  In the 17 February match in Accra, Zambia lost 0–4.

The 2012 season coach was Beauty Mwamba. The assistant coach was Angela Sunga. This team competed in the Confederation of African Football qualifiers for the FIFA U-17 World Cup that will be held in Azerbaijan in September 2012.  They did not advance out of their region. In the early rounds, Zambia played Botswana women's national under-17 football team in Gaborone, beating them 5–1.  In the return match against Botswana in Lusaka, Zambia won 2–0. During qualification, Zambia played Nigeria, losing 1–2 at home and 0–5 in Nigeria. Zambian officials suspected that the Nigerian team cheated by having age ineligible players on their squad. The national federation would have liked to appear the decision but it would have cost US$2,000 (K10 million) and they did not have the money to make the appeal.  The loss also brought to question continued support by the Football Association of Zambia to support the team.

Competitive record

FIFA U-17 Women's World Cup

See also 

 Zambia women's national football team
 Zambia women's national under-20 football team
 Zambia men's national under-17 football team
 Zambia men's national under-20 football team

References

External links
 Twitter: Zambia football

women
Women's national under-17 association football teams
African national under-17 association football teams